is a resort town located in Nagano Prefecture, Japan. , the town had an estimated population of 20,323 in 9897 households, and a population density of 130 persons per km². Karuizawa is one of the oldest and most famous summer resorts in Japan, visited by many people from different countries since the 19th century.

Geography

Karuizawa is located in eastern Nagano Prefecture, bordered by Gunma Prefecture to the north, east and south. The town is located on an elevated plain at the foot of Mount Asama, one of Japan's most active volcanoes. The mountain is classed as a Category A active volcano. A small eruption was detected in June 2015, a more significant eruption spewing hot rocks and a plume of ash occurred in February 2015. Mt. Asama's most destructive eruption in recent recorded history took place in 1783, when over 1,000 were killed. The volcano is actively monitored by scientists and climbing close to the summit is prohibited.

Usui Pass
Highest elevation:  (Top of Mount Asama)
Lowest elevation:

Surrounding municipalities
Nagano Prefecture
 Saku
Miyota
Gunma Prefecture
 Takasaki
 Annaka
 Shimonita
 Naganohara
 Tsumagoi

Climate
Karuizawa has a humid continental climate (Köppen climate classification Dwb) with warm summers and cold winters. Precipitation is much heavier in the summer than in the winter.

History

The area of present-day Karuizawa was part of ancient Shinano Province, and developed as Karuisawa-shuku, a post station on the Nakasendō highway connecting Edo with Kyoto during the Edo period.

 August 2, 1876: The hamlets of Kutsukake, Shiozawanitta, Karijuku, Narusawanitta, and Yui merged to form the village of Nagakura. The village of Hatsuji in Saku District absorbed the hamlet of Matorikaya.
 January 14, 1879: Kitasaku District was created, and the town of Usuitoge, and the villages of Karuizawa, Nagakura, Oiwake were established with Kitasaku District.
 1886: Canadian Anglican missionary Rev. Alexander Croft Shaw and Tokyo Imperial University English professor James Main Dixon introduced Karuizawa as a summer resort.
 April 1, 1889: With the establishment of the modern municipalities system, the town of Usuitoge, and the villages of Karuizawa, and the areas of the former villages of Kutsukake, Shiozawanitta, and Karijuku from the village of Nagakura merged to form the village of Higashinagakura in Kitasaku District, and the areas of the former villages of Narusawanitta and Yui in the village of Nagakura, and the villages of Hatsuji and Oiwake merged to form the village of Nishinagakura in Kitasaku District.
 1910s: Begins to attract the attention of other expatriates and Japanese. Specially Germans congregate here, language professors and academics hold annual conferences.
 August 1, 1923: The village of Higashinagakura gains town status to become the town of Karuizawa. (The pre-town areas before gaining the town status is known as Kyu-Karuizawa.) 
 May 8, 1942: The village of Nishinagakura is merged into Karuizawa
 1942-45: Site of an internment camp for enemy foreigners and diplomats during World War 2.
 From 1943 relocation of an increasing number of Germans from Tokyo, which is suffering from US fire bombing. The Supreme Commander for the Allied Powers deported most German nationals in late 1947.
 1951: Selected as International Cultural and Tourism City. 
 February 1, 1957: Karuizawa absorbed Serizawa area from the former village of Goga, which was absorbed by the town of Miyota.
 April 1, 1959: The Kajikazawa area of the former village of Oiwake was split off and merged with the town of Miyota.
 1964: 1964 Summer Olympics (Equestrian)
 February 1972: Asama-Sanso incident; Police besiege communist militants holed up in holiday resort after mass killing and hostage taking.
 October 1, 1997: The Nagano Shinkansen opens, serving Karuizawa.
 1998: 1998 Winter Olympics (Curling)
 2004: Mount Asama erupts.
 2016: The G7 Transport Ministers' Meeting
 2019: The G20 Energy and Environment Ministers' Meeting

Demographics
Per Japanese census data, the population of Karuizawa has been increasing over the past 60 years.

Economy
Since one of the origins of the Seibu Group is in Karuizawa (see also Yasujiro Tsutsumi), Seibu is still developing big businesses in this town such as Prince Hotels.

Hoshino Resorts is headquartered in Karuizawa.

Education
Karuizawa has three public elementary school and one public middle school operated by the town government, and one public high school is operated by the Nagano Prefectural Board of Education. The UWC ISAK Japan international school is also located in the town.

Transportation

Railway
 East Japan Railway Company – Hokuriku Shinkansen

 Shinano Railway
 -   -

Highway
 Jōshin-etsu Expressway

International relations
  Campos do Jordão, Brazil
  Whistler, British Columbia, Canada

Local attractions

Karuizawa was developed as a European-style resort town by a Scottish-Canadian missionary in 1888. In the following decades, the town attracted visitors from across the country seeking to escape the heat of summer and enjoy vacations, as well as a significant number of Westerners. Unlike many other hill stations, Karuizawa was actively open to the natives from the beginning, and many Japanese scholars, artists and others had already built "Western-style" villas in the town by the early 20th century. The Japanese and Western communities interacted well with each other through summer recreation activities and the like. In the 21st century the town retains significant Western cultural influence, and its alpine beauty and cool summer climate (similar to parts of Europe) continue to draw visitors.

More recently, Karuizawa has become a popular year-round resort for mainly Japanese, offering many outdoor sports, hot springs and recreational activities. Convenient road and rail access from central Tokyo has ensured Karuizawa's popularity as a location for second homes and resort hotels since the Meiji era.

Karuizawa is known for its historic shopping street known as "Ginza dōri" or "Kyū-dō" (Ginza Street, or the Old Road) and association with both Japanese royalty and visitors such as John Lennon and Yoko Ono. As a side note, The Crown Prince Akihito met Michiko Shoda for the first time on a tennis court in Karuizawa in August 1957, and John Lennon spent several summers in Karuizawa with his family in the late 1970s.

Karuizawa hosted equestrian events in the 1964 Summer Olympics as well as curling in the 1998 Winter Olympics. It is the first city in the world to host both Summer and Winter Olympic events.

Since 1997, Karuizawa has been accessible via the JR East Nagano Shinkansen. New high speed rail links has resulted in modest population growth and the development of large outlet style shopping malls.

In popular media
 The Birds of Karuizawa from Sept haïkaï, Olivier Messiaen's composition
 The Wind Rises, Studio Ghibli film
 Karuizawa appeared in a part of the film.
 When Marnie Was There, Studio Ghibli film
 The model of the mansion that appeared in the film is the villa in Karuizawa.
 Karuizawa Yūkai Annai, Enix adventure game
 The Curious Adventures of Sherlock Holmes in Japan, Dale Furutani's novel
 The story is based on the premise that Sherlock Holmes was in Karuizawa in the “missing years (1891-1894)”.

Notable residents

 Neil Gordon Munro, Scottish physician and anthropologist
 Paul Jacoulet, French woodblock print artist
 Massimo Baistrocchi, Italian diplomat
 Paul Bryan, British Conservative politician
 T. Canby Jones, American professor
 E. Herbert Norman, Canadian diplomat and historian
 Ronald Lampman Watts, Canadian professor
 Willie Weeks, American bass guitarist
 Tatsuo Hori, Japanese writer
 Ken Watanabe, Japanese actor
 Kōji Tamaki, Japanese singer
 Yukihiro Takahashi, Japanese drummer
 Kazumi Watanabe, Japanese guitarist
 Towa Tei, Japanese record producer
 Tabaimo, Japanese artist

Summer residents
 Alexander Croft Shaw, Canadian missionary
 J. G. Waller, Canadian missionary
 James Main Dixon, Scottish professor
 Edward Bickersteth, Anglican missionary
 Walter Weston, English missionary
 Hannah Riddell, English missionary
 Hugh Fraser, English diplomat
 Bernard Leach, British studio potter
 Francis Brinkley, Anglo-Irish editor
 Walter de Havilland, English patent attorney
 John Lennon, English musician
 August Karl Reischauer, American missionary
 Mary Eddy Kidder, American missionary
 Edwin O. Reischauer, American diplomat
 Edgar Bancroft, American diplomat
 William J. Sebald, American diplomat
 Joseph Grew, American diplomat
 Robert L. Eichelberger, American general officer
 Donald Keene, American writer and professor
 Merrell Vories Hitotsuyanagi, American architect
 Antonin Raymond, Czech-American architect
 Roman Rosen, Russian baron and diplomat
 Leo Sirota, Ukrainian-born Jewish pianist
 Beate Sirota Gordon, Austrian-born American performing arts presenter 
 Fosco Maraini, Italian photographer
 Topazia Alliata, Italian noblewoman and painter
 Dacia Maraini, Italian writer
 Hirohito, Japanese emperor
 Akihito, Japanese emperor
 Naruhito, Japanese emperor
 Empress Michiko, Japanese empress
 Empress Masako, Japanese empress
 Prince Yasuhiko Asaka, member of the Japanese imperial family
 Ōkuma Shigenobu, Japanese prime minister
 Fumimaro Konoe, Japanese prime minister
 Ichirō Hatoyama, Japanese prime minister
 Eisaku Satō, Japanese prime minister
 Morihiro Hosokawa, Japanese prime minister
 Tarō Asō, Japanese prime minister
 Shōjirō Ishibashi, Japanese businessman
 Akio Morita, Japanese businessman
 Yoshiaki Tsutsumi, Japanese businessman
 Masayoshi Son, Korean-Japanese businessman
 Sadako Ogata, Japanese professor
 Nitobe Inazō, Japanese author
 Takeo Arishima, Japanese writer
 Ryūnosuke Akutagawa, Japanese writer
 Yasunari Kawabata, Japanese writer
 Kunihiko Kodaira, Japanese mathematician
 Shigeaki Hinohara, Japanese physician
 D. T. Suzuki, Japanese Buddhist monk
 Yoko Ono, Japanese artist
 Arata Isozaki, Japanese architect
 Junzo Sakakura, Japanese architect
 Matsumoto Hakuō II, Japanese kabuki actor
 Ichikawa Ennosuke III, Japanese kabuki actor
 Sayuri Yoshinaga, Japanese actress

Evacuees of World War II
 Leonid Kreutzer, Russian-born Jewish pianist
 Alexander Mogilevsky, Ukrainian violinist
 Victor Pokrovsky, Russian choral director
 Varvara Bubnova, Russian painter
 Victor Starffin, Russian baseball player
 Manfred Gurlitt, German conductor
 Eta Harich-Schneider, German harpsichordist
 Karlfried Graf Dürckheim, German diplomat and Zen master
 Joseph Rosenstock, Polish-born American conductor
 Robert Guillain, French journalist
 Widar Bagge, Swedish diplomat
 Francis Haar, Hungarian socio-photographer

References

External links

 :ja:軽井沢 
Official Website 
Karuizawa Tourism Website 
Karuizawa Tourism Website 

 
Towns in Nagano Prefecture
Venues of the 1964 Summer Olympics
Venues of the 1998 Winter Olympics
Olympic equestrian venues